Ruma is an upazila of Bandarban District in the Division of Chittagong, Bangladesh.

Geography
It has 3,650 households and a total area of 492.1 km2.

Demographics
According to the 1991 Bangladesh census, Ruma had a population of 19,001. Males constituted 54.27% of the population, and females 45.73%. The population aged 18 or over was 10,144. Ruma had an average literacy rate of 27.8% (7+ years), compared to the national average of 32.4%.

Points of interest
 Bagakain Lake
 Keokradong
 Tazing Dong
 Nilgiri Resort
 Rijuk Waterfall

Administration
Ruma Upazila is divided into four union parishads: Ghalangya, Paindu, Remakri, and Ruma. The union parishads are subdivided into 15 mauzas and 225 villages.

See also
Upazilas of Bangladesh
Districts of Bangladesh
Divisions of Bangladesh

References

Upazilas of Bandarban District